Timothy James Kadavy (born November 25, 1963) is a retired United States Army lieutenant general, who served as the 20th director of the Army National Guard from March 27, 2015 to March 25, 2019. He previously served as the special assistant to the vice chief of the National Guard Bureau, the adjutant general of the Nebraska National Guard, Deputy Director of the Army National Guard, and as the commander of Combined Joint Inter Agency Task Force-Afghanistan, which was part of the NATO International Security Assistance Force mission in that country. Kadavy was nominated by the President to become the Vice Chief of the National Guard Bureau with the rank of lieutenant general, on March 5, 2019. The Senate returned his nomination to the president without action on January 3, 2020. After leaving his assignment as the director of the Army National Guard, he served as a two-star special assistant to the chief of the National Guard Bureau from May 23, 2019 until his retirement on August 3, 2020. He retired from the Army with the rank of lieutenant general after over 36 years of service.

Early life
Timothy James Kadavy was born in Lincoln, Nebraska on November 25, 1963, the son of Leo I. Kadavy and Rose Bohaty Kadavy. He graduated from Omaha's Millard South High School in 1982 and enlisted in the Nebraska Army National Guard. He received his commission as a second lieutenant of Armor from the Reserve Officers' Training Corps program at the University of Nebraska in 1987.

Military career
Kadavy began his officer career as a platoon leader in the Nebraska Army National Guard's Troop A, 1st Squadron, 167th Cavalry Regiment. His subsequent assignments through May 1994 included: executive officer of Troop B, 1-167th Cavalry; liaison officer, Headquarters, 1-167th Cavalry; assistant operations and training officer (S3 Air), Headquarters, 1-167th Cavalry; and commander, Troop B, 1-167th Cavalry, and personnel staff officer (S1), 1-167th Cavalry.

From May 1994 to August 2001, Kadavy carried out staff assignments at Fifth United States Army; United States Army Forces Command; and the Army National Guard staff at the National Guard Bureau. From September 2001 through September 2003, he was commander of 1st Squadron, 167th Cavalry, including deployment to Bosnia-Herzegovina for Operation Joint Forge.

From September 2003 to June 2004, Kadavy was a student in the United States Army War College's Fellowship Program at the Drug Enforcement Administration. From July 2004 to March 2006, he served as Chief of Plans, Readiness and Mobilization for the Army National Guard. He then served in Iraq from April to September 2006, as Chief of the Reserve Component Division for Multi-National Corps – Iraq. From September 2006 to October 2007, Kadavy was assigned as operations and training officer (G3) for the Army National Guard.

General Officer
In November 2007, Kadavy was selected for appointment as the adjutant general of the Nebraska National Guard, succeeding Roger P. Lempke, and received a state promotion to brigadier general. He was federally recognized as a brigadier general in January 2009.

Kadavy was named deputy director of the Army National Guard in August 2009. He was promoted to major general in December 2010.

In January 2013, Kadavy was announced as the next commander of Combined Joint Inter Agency Task Force-Afghanistan (CJIATF-A). He was replaced on an interim basis by Brigadier General Walter E. Fountain, and began his new duties in April 2013.

In May 2013, Major General Judd H. Lyons, Kadavy's successor as adjutant general of the Nebraska National Guard in 2009, was announced as the next deputy director of the Army National Guard. He assumed those duties in July 2013.

In March 2014, Kadavy returned from Afghanistan and began an assignment as special assistant to the vice chief of the National Guard Bureau.

On March 10, 2015, Kadavy was nominated by President Obama to become the next director of the Army National Guard, with appointment to the rank of lieutenant general in the active duty reserve of the Army. He was confirmed by the United States Senate on March 27, and promoted in a ceremony on April 14.

In March 2019, the president nominated Kadavy for appointment as vice chief of the National Guard Bureau, and Vice Chief Daniel R. Hokanson was nominated to succeed Kadavy as director of the Army National Guard. In March 2019, Kadavy was reassigned as a special assistant to the National Guard Bureau chief at his permanent two-star rank of major general while awaiting Senate confirmation, to allow Hokanson to take over as Army Guard director. The Senate returned Kadavy's nomination to the president without action on January 3, 2020. Kadavy retired as a lieutenant general on August 3, 2020. At his retirement he received several awards, including a second award of the Army Distinguished Service Medal.

Education
1987 Bachelor of Science degree in business administration, University of Nebraska, Lincoln, Nebraska
1996 Master of Arts degree in procurement and acquisitions management, Webster University, Saint Louis, Missouri
2004 Drug Enforcement Administration Fellowship, United States Army War College, Washington, D.C.
2008 Joint and Combined Warfighting School (JPME-II), National Defense University, Norfolk, Virginia
2010 CAPSTONE, Fort Lesley J. McNair, National Defense University, Washington, D.C.
2012 Joint Flag Officer Warfighting Course, Maxwell Air Force Base, Alabama

Awards and decorations

Chronological list of assignments
December 1984 – April 1988, Platoon Leader, Alpha Troop, 1st Squadron, 167th Cavalry, Nebraska Army National Guard, Fremont, Nebraska
April 1988 – December 1989, Executive Officer, Bravo Troop, 1st Squadron, 167th Cavalry, Nebraska Army National Guard, Omaha, Nebraska
December 1989 – October 1990, Liaison Officer, 1st Squadron, 167th Cavalry, Nebraska Army National Guard, Lincoln, Nebraska
October 1990 – June 1991, S-3 Air, 1st Squadron, 167th Cavalry, Nebraska Army National Guard, Lincoln, Nebraska
June 1991 – December 1993, Commander, Bravo Troop, 1st Squadron, 167th Cavalry, Nebraska Army National Guard, Omaha, Nebraska
December 1993 – May 1994, Personnel Officer, 1st Squadron, 167th Cavalry, Nebraska Army National Guard, Lincoln, Nebraska
May 1994 – December 1996, Operations Officer, Operational Readiness Evaluations, Headquarters, Fifth United States Army, Fort Sam Houston, Texas
January 1997 – June 1998, Executive Officer, Deputy Commanding General (Reserve Component), United States Army Forces Command, Fort McPherson, Georgia
July 1998 – March 2000, Program Fielding Officer, Army National Guard Distributive Training Technology Program, Arlington, Virginia
April 2000 – August 2001, Branch Chief, Policy and Reporting, Readiness Branch, Army National Guard, Arlington, Virginia
September 2001 – October 2002, Commander, 1st Squadron, 167th Cavalry, Nebraska Army National Guard, Lincoln, Nebraska
November 2002 – September 2003, Task Force Commander, 1st Squadron, 167th Cavalry, Fort Riley, Kansas/Camp McGovern, Bosnia-Herzegovina
September 2003 – June 2004, Student, Army War College Fellowship Program, Headquarters, Drug Enforcement Administration, Washington, D.C.
July 2004 – March 2006, Chief, Plans Readiness and Mobilization, Army National Guard, Arlington, Virginia
April 2006 – September 2006, Chief, Reserve Component Support Division, Multi-National Corps-Iraq, Camp Victory, Baghdad, Iraq
September 2006 – October 2007, G3, Army National Guard, Arlington, Virginia
November 2007 – August 2009, The Adjutant General, Joint Force Headquarters, Nebraska National Guard, Lincoln, Nebraska
August 2009 – March 2013, Deputy Director, Army National Guard, Arlington, Virginia
April 2013 – March 2014, Commander, Combined Joint Inter Agency Task Force-Afghanistan (CJIATF-A), Kabul, Afghanistan
March 2014 – March 2015, Special Assistant to the Vice Chief of the National Guard Bureau, The Pentagon, Washington, D.C.
March 2015 – March 2019 Director of the Army National Guard, Arlington, Virginia
March 2019 – August 2020 Special Assistant to the Chief of the National Guard Bureau, Arlington, Virginia

Effective dates of ranks
Lieutenant General, August 3, 2020 (retired list)
Major General, May 23, 2019 (reverted)
Lieutenant General, March 27, 2015
Major General, December 22, 2010
Brigadier General, January 29, 2009
Colonel July 28, 2004
Lieutenant Colonel, February 25, 2000
Major August 9, 1995
Captain, October 10, 1990
First Lieutenant, May 11, 1987
Second Lieutenant, May 12, 1984

References

External links

Timothy J. Kadavy at National Guard Bureau General Officer Management Office
Timothy J. Kadavy at International Security Assistance Force -- Afghanistan

Living people
1963 births
Military personnel from Omaha, Nebraska
United States Army personnel of the Iraq War
United States Army personnel of the War in Afghanistan (2001–2021)
University of Nebraska alumni
Webster University alumni
United States Army Command and General Staff College alumni
Recipients of the Distinguished Service Medal (US Army)
Recipients of the Defense Superior Service Medal
Recipients of the Legion of Merit
National Guard (United States) generals
Nebraska National Guard personnel